Newsha K. Ajami is a hydrologist specializing in urban water policy and sustainable water resource management. Though trained as a scientist and engineer, her work is interdisciplinary in nature and combines science with its social counterparts. She is currently a senior scholar at Stanford University and manages the university's Urban Water program.

Early life and education 
Ajami was born and raised in Tehran, Iran. From a young age she was fascinated by math and problem solving games, and spent much of her time playing with Legos. Ajami credits her inspiration to become an engineer to her maternal grandfather who was a railroads engineer in Iran. Ajami later went on to earn her B.S. in Civil Engineering from Tehran Polytechnic. During her time as an undergraduate she had the opportunity to intern with a consulting company that helped develop decision support tools to aid in dam operation and reservoir management in Iran. This opportunity sparked Ajami's interest in the environmental and social implications of water, and decision making process. After entering the field of hydrological sciences, Ajami continued her studies in the United States at the University of Arizona, where she received her M.S. in hydrology and water resources. She further continued her education at the University of California, Irvine where she earned her Ph.D in civil and environmental engineering.

Career and research 
Ajami is an engineer and hydrologist by training but much of her current research is interdisciplinary in nature. Her work focuses on applying mathematical models of societal implications to better understand water consumption and demand in arid and semiarid regions, especially in the Western United States. Ajami currently works at Stanford University as the director of urban water policy for water in the west and focuses much of her current work on ways to improve water related outcomes for scientists, stakeholders, and policy makers. Though she is a trained scientist, her work focuses on creating financial and social incentives to mitigate water use and practices for the future of California residents. She applies her hydraulic mathematical models that explain the natural and physical processes of water to climate change, in order to better predict and forecast the future of water disturbances. In the context of recent droughts in California, Ajami sees them as an opportunity to refine policies and redefine water management practices. She believes that California has the potential to emerge as a work leader in water similar to the progress made within the energy sector. Some of her most recent research explored the ways in which social media impacts perception and memory of drought and how it influences individual water use practices. Needless to say, her research is groundbreaking in its implications and practical uses for the future development of water usage in California.

Through her career, Ajami has received many significant awards. In 2005 she received the National Science Foundation award for AMS science and Policy Colloquium. She also received the ICSC-World Laboratory Hydrologic Science and Water Resources Fellowship from 2000 to 2003 in which she studied environmental policy and law. For Ajami, the fellowship opportunity provided her with a transition into politics and the legal system in relation to environmental issues.

Personal life 
Ajami resides in San Francisco with her husband and two children. Ajami serves as a mayoral appointee to San Francisco Public Utilities Commission and was a gubernatorial appointee to the Bay Area Water Quality control board where she served for seven years.

References 

Year of birth missing (living people)
Living people
American hydrologists
Amirkabir University of Technology alumni
Iranian emigrants to the United States
Stanford University people
University of Arizona alumni
University of California, Irvine alumni